The North West Canada Medal is a British campaign medal issued to the soldiers, volunteers, and North-West Mounted Police (NWMP) personnel who participated in putting down the North-West Rebellion in 1885.

Eligibility
The medal was established by the Canadian government in September 1885 after consultation between the governor general of Canada and the British secretary of state for the colonies. 

It was awarded to those who took part in the suppression of the North-West Rebellion of 1885 and who served west of Port Arthur, Ontario. Recipients included a number of volunteers, including the crew of the steamer Northcote for service at the Battle of Batoche, and members of the Prince Albert Volunteers for service at the Battle of Duck Lake. Initially, members of the NWMP were not eligible. However, a Canadian order in council of 13 December 1886 recommended that the NWMP receive the medal, this being accepted by the British government on 16 February 1887. A total of 920 medals were then awarded to the NWMP. 

No British Army units took part, although seventeen British Army officers were attached to Canadian units. 

During the 1930s, surviving NWMP recipients were each granted $300.

Appearance
Around the edge is the inscription "VICTORIA REGINA ET IMPERATRIX". The reverse, designed by Thomas Brock, has the inscription "NORTH WEST 1885 CANADA" in three lines surrounded by a wreath of maple leaves. 

The clasp "SASKATCHEWAN" was awarded to those present at any of the three main encounters during the rebellion; along the Saskatchewan and Fish rivers and the Battle of Batoche. Approximately 1,760 medals were awarded with the clasp. A number of veterans of the Battle of Batoche added an unofficial "BATOCHE" clasp to their medal.

Medals were issued unnamed, although many recipients had their name and unit engraved on the rim.

References

Canadian campaign medals
British campaign medals